Thankachen K. Emmanuel, born as Emmanuel Joseph, is an Indian film producer. His debut production was Kadha Thudarunnu directed by Sathyan Anthikkad.

Filmography

References

 http://www.malayalambest.com/watch_live_Emmanuel_Thankachen.html

External links
 

Living people
1961 births
Malayalam film producers
People from Kottayam district
Film producers from Kerala